Exochorda  is a small genus of flowering plants in the family Rosaceae, native to China and central Asia (Turkestan). They are used as ornamental plants with the common name pearl bush, or pearlbush. Numerous species have been described on the basis of differing appearance and geographical separation, but a systematic study revealed that the different types are closely related and probably all descended from a single species that formerly had a wide distribution that has been fragmented by habitat loss. As a single species the correct name is E. racemosa.

Description
The flowers are white, with five petals, produced in spring on the ends of the branches. The fruit is a dry coccetum consisting of five fused carpels, which split to release the flattened seeds. Lindley wrote in the original description of the genus "The free placentary chords external to the carpels have suggested the name of the genus."

Cultivation
A valuable garden hybrid is known as E. × macrantha C.K.Schneid. or Exochorda 'The Bride'. Lemoine's catalog of 1904 [as cited by C. K. Schneider, translated by Wikipedia] stated "We obtained this hybrid by fertilizing E. alberti with pollen from E. grandiflora. The clusters of flowers which terminate each shoot, are erect or horizontal, each one with 8 to 10 large flowers, well opened and unfolded, snow white. This new shrub has the vigorous growth of E. grandiflora. As an isolated specimen the effect is magnificent." This plant has gained the Royal Horticultural Society's Award of Garden Merit.

Gallery

References

External links

Flora of China: Exochorda
Huxley, A. (1992). The New RHS Dictionary of Gardening 2: 274. Macmillan. 
Trees & Shrubs, Botanica, 1987, pg. 373. 
http://www.bbc.co.uk/gardening/plants/plant_finder/plant_pages/310.shtml BBC Gardening Plant Finder

Exochordeae
Monotypic Rosaceae genera